Barry Berrigan (born 6 June 1975) is an Australian former professional rugby league footballer who played as a  the 1990s and 2000s. 

He played for the Brisbane Broncos in the National Rugby League competition alongside his younger brother, Shaun Berrigan.

Background
He was born in Brisbane, Queensland, Australia. He is of German descent.

Career
Berrigan started his career with the Canterbury-Bankstown Bulldogs in 1995 where he remained until 1999. After a few stints in the Queensland Wizard Cup with Redcliffe and Toowoomba he linked with the Brisbane Broncos in 2003.  He made 20 first grade appearances for them in 2005. Berrigan was forced to retire after Round 2 in 2006 citing ongoing neck problems. At the conclusion of his career he played the 2008 season for his junior club Wests Mitchelton. This side included Paul Farrell, Clayton Sellars and Jack Muir. Barry will play alongside his brother Shaun for the Dalby Diehards in the Toowoomba Rugby league competition for 2014.

Career highlights 

Junior Club: Wests Mitchelton
First Grade Debut: Round 10, Brisbane Broncos v. Illawarra at Steelers, 20 May 1995

References

External links
Bulldogs profile

1975 births
Australian people of German descent
Australian people of Italian descent
Australian rugby league players
Canterbury-Bankstown Bulldogs players
Brisbane Broncos players
Living people
Wests Panthers players
Redcliffe Dolphins players
Rugby league hookers
Rugby league players from Brisbane